Golabad (also Romanized as Golābād) is a village in Bazman Rural District, Bazman District, Iranshahr County, Sistan and Baluchestan Province, Iran. At the 2006 census, its population was 160, in 27 families.

References 

Populated places in Iranshahr County